Sir Sullivan may refer to:
Arthur Sullivan, English composer
Sir Edward Sullivan, 1st Baronet, Irish lawyer